Loch Shurrery (also known as Loch Shurrey) is a small, shallow, lowland freshwater loch lying approximately  south west of Thurso in the Scottish Highlands. The loch was surveyed on 6 October 1902 by John Parsons and T.R.H. Garrett and later charted as part of Sir John Murray's Bathymetrical Survey of Fresh-Water Lochs of Scotland 1897-1909. A dam lies to the north end of the loch.

Approximately  from the northern end of the loch are the archaeological remains of an Iron Age hut circle with a medium-sized oval house. Some pottery was found at the site. At the southern end of the loch is Lambsdale Leans, a cairn with possible cist or chamber. Two Viking graves lie nearby.

The loch is used for fishing and the Dounreay Fly Fishing Association keeps a boat on the loch for members and visitors.

References

Shurrery
Shurrery
Caithness